Radio Minería was a Chilean radio station that operated from 22 June 1941 to 31 March 1999. 

Radio Mineria was founded by the Sociedad Nacional de Minería (National Mining Society) (SONAMI).

References

Radio stations in Chile
Defunct radio stations
Radio stations established in 1941
Radio stations disestablished in 1999

Defunct mass media in Chile